Airlines for America (A4A), formerly known as Air Transport Association of America (ATA), is an American trade association and lobbying group based in Washington, D.C. that represents major North American airlines since 1936.

The A4A is frequently involved in US government decisions regarding the aviation industry including the creation of the Civil Aeronautics Board, establishment of the air traffic control system and airline deregulation. In its lobbying efforts, A4A publicly promotes the air transport as safe and efficient, and it advocates for favorable regulations on taxation, competition, and environmental standards.

Since 1956, the A4A has been responsible for publishing numerical technical classifications and defining specifications for electronic technical data interchange of aircraft systems and sub-systems used in aircraft engineering and aircraft maintenance. These are grouped into 100 Chapters, referred to by civil aviation standards as spec 100, containing the data specifications for maintenance requirements and procedures, aircraft configuration control, and flight operations. In 2000, ATA incorporated earlier specifications into spec 2100 and eventually ATA iSpec 2200 as Information Standards for Aviation Maintenance. In that publication, the ATA described iSpec 2200 as "a global aviation industry standard for the content, structure, and electronic exchange of aircraft engineering, maintenance, and flight operations information".

Profile

Mission

A4A's stated purpose is to "foster a business and regulatory environment that ensures safe and secure air transportation and enables U.S. airlines to flourish, stimulating economic growth locally, nationally and globally". A4A advocates on behalf of participating regularly scheduled airline corporations to the U.S. Congress, state legislatures, the U.S. Department of Transportation, including the Federal Aviation Administration, and the U.S. Department of Homeland Security, including the Transportation Security Administration and Customs and Border Protection.

Since its founding, A4A has played a major role in all government decisions concerning aviation, including the creation of the Civil Aeronautics Board, the creation of the air traffic control system and airline deregulation. It also advocates that the American government implement a national airline policy that will enable U.S. airlines to function as effective multinational enterprises. Furthermore, it declares that an element of such a policy is the modernization of the U.S. air traffic management system, the Next Generation Air Transportation System (NextGen).

Leadership

Nicholas Calio
Nicholas Calio became president of the Air Transport Association (as Airlines for America was then known), in January 2011. Calio was hired after the Republicans made big gains in the 2010 midterm elections. Hiring Calio, "a brand name" Republican, known for working well with Democrats, was seen as a positive for the ATA. Democratic lobbyist Jimmy Ryan said: "He’s so well liked by both Democrats and Republicans that for the ATA it’s a huge coup. The new challenge is figuring out how to get things done in a bipartisan manner and Nick is the guy who’s got the record to do it.” Senator Harry Reid said, "...Nick was a straight shooter and I appreciated that about him when he was at the White House. The ATA is fortunate to have a seasoned hand who understands the importance of finding bipartisan solutions.”

Government relations
A4A senior staff members have testified before Congress in favor of lowering taxes on airlines, arguing that current policies reduce profits and growth in the industry. The A4A has also lobbied on topics such as enhancing competition in international markets and advocating for a comprehensive review of  the FAA's NextGen program costs, benefits, progress and management. A4A works with its members on legal and technical issues affecting the U.S. airline industry.

A4A operates member committees related to fuel; airports; engineering and maintenance; the environment; training; security; facilitation; ground safety; cargo; passenger services; communications; government affairs; and international affairs. A4A advocates common association member positions before state and local governments to assure governmental and public understanding of the A4A's positions on the aspects of commercial airlines.

Legislative and regulatory priorities
A4A's priorities include maintaining airline safety; maximizing airline profits; reforming energy-commodity markets; creating an international framework for reducing industry emissions; accelerating modernization of the air traffic control system; and reducing taxes on airlines.

National airline policy
Airlines for America supports NextGen modernization of the air traffic control system. This system will update the current 1950s radar-based technology with a modern, satellite-based navigation system. Aviation experts predict that a modern air traffic management system will save jet fuel and reduce delays by allowing planes to fly shorter routes and by allowing more aircraft to fly safely at any given time. Modernizing the air traffic control system would also reduce the amount of time that airplanes spend waiting on runways and in holding patterns.

Officially, the A4A has announced five "core elements" of a national airline policy include reducing taxes on the industry, reducing regulation, increased access to foreign markets, making the industry more attractive for investors, and improving the air traffic control system. A4A President and CEO, Nicholas E. Calio, said, "Airlines enable their local businesses to export goods, connect their residents to the world for business and leisure travel – and, importantly, create good-paying jobs. We face the very real risk of U.S. airlines increasingly shifting to feeding foreign airlines at our gateways, rather than expanding their flying of lucrative international routes."

In 2011, Calio said that the value of American exports shipped by air was 117 times the value of exports transported by sea and that commercial aviation had become an important catalyst for the economy. Calio said that the regulatory and tax environment, in addition to inadequate infrastructure, are making it hard for the US airline industry to compete internationally and still turn a profit.

Consumer protections
On April 25, 2011, the Enhancing Airline Passenger Protections, "76 Federal Regulation 23110" rule was enacted. Amongst other items, the rule includes raising the minimum "denied boarding compensation" to customers with valid tickets yet still not allowed to board the aircraft. The legislation further penalizes airlines up to $27,500 per passenger if left stranded aboard an aircraft, on a tarmac for more than three hours. In 2010 the then Air Transport Association and the Regional Airline Association both opposed this legislation. The ATA stated, "As we have noted before, competition in the marketplace and existing Department regulations supported by fair enforcement are sufficient to ensure airlines continue to deliver good customer service."

Taxes
In 2013, Airlines for America assembled a coalition of labor, business, and consumer advocacy groups in order to oppose increasing the tax on airline tickets that funds the Transportation Security Administration. A4A called this campaign "Stop Air Tax Now." A4A's efforts were in response to a proposal in late 2013 to increase the tax to $5.00 from $2.50 per ticket. In 2012 this tax generated about $2.3 billion in revenue, double the amount for 2002. A4A staffers handed out air-sickness bags and leaflets at Washington Reagan National Airport asking "Are higher taxes on air travel making you sick?" Nicholas Calio said, "Raising taxes is lose-lose for airlines, passengers, jobs  and our overall economy – it’s inappropriate  for Congress to use airline passengers as an ATM when it needs more money. Doubling the TSA passenger security tax would cost passengers more than $730 million annually, placing a huge additional tax on the traveling public, with no direct benefit to those who pay it.”

In 2014, Airlines for America supported legislation, the Transparent Airfares Act of 2014 (H.R. 4156; 113th Congress), to advertise ticket prices by their base fare in addition to various government fees and taxes. The legislation would reverse Department of Transportation regulations implemented in 2012 that force airlines to advertise base fares lumped together with taxes and fees. Airlines for America argues that current regulations hide excessive taxes on air travel. Nicholas Calio said, "It's a misnomer to characterize the current law as a consumer protection rule when it really protects the government, not airline passengers, and it's disingenuous for Washington to hide the ball and not be held responsible for the taxes they impose on air travel." A4A said that as of 2014, $61 of a $300 domestic airfare is taxes.

Energy
Airlines for America also has been involved in promoting fuel efficiency and the development of alternative fuels. In April 2014, Nancy Young, A4A's Vice President of Environmental Affairs, testified before the Senate Committee on Agriculture, Nutrition and Forestry on alternative aviation fuels. Young pointed out that airlines have a natural incentive to be energy efficient and outlined what the airline is doing to support aviation biofuels. Young encouraged the federal government to further support public-private partnerships such as the Commercial Aviation Alternative Fuels Initiative (CAAFI), the Farm to Fly program.

A4A opposed efforts by the European Union to unilaterially extend its Emissions Trading Scheme (ETS) to international aviation. The European Union Parliament stayed the extension of the ETS until 2016. The extension of "stop the clock" on ETS was consistent with the agreement reached at the International Civil Aviation Organization Assembly in 2013, which rejected unilateral regulations of carbon emissions while committing the airline industry to achieve carbon neutral growth starting from 2020. The US Congress passed a law authorising the secretary of transportation to prohibit American aircraft operators from complying with the EU ETS.

Litigation

Labor relations
In 2010 a federal court upheld new democratic voting procedures for workers in the airline and rail industries who want to form unions. Earlier that year, the National Mediation Board (NMB) issued a new rule that says air and rail union elections must be decided by a majority of votes cast. Previously under the Railway Labor Act, which covers rail and airline workers, every worker who did not cast a vote in a representation election was automatically counted as a “No” vote. The Air Transport Association and ten of its member airlines, filed suit in the U.S. District Court for the District of Columbia to block the NMB ruling. The court upheld the new rule and denied ATA's (A4A's) request for an injunction.

COVID-19 
A4A advocated for ending federal transportation mask mandates during the COVID-19 pandemic.

A4A Economic Report and Industry Handbook
Since 1937 A4A has released an annual economic report on the U.S. airline industry that includes statistics on operational and financial results for passenger and cargo operations. This report includes data on industry revenue, expenses, traffic, fuel use, safety, economic impact and employment. A4A also publishes a handbook on the airline industry that provides background information on airline economics, operations, safety, security and history.

ATA Spec 100: Manufacturers' Technical Data
The then Air Transport Association released the newest version of ATA Spec 100 in 1999. According to the A4A website, this information will not be revised and has been combined with ATA Spec 2100 to produce the ATA iSpec 2200: Information Standards for Aviation Maintenance manual.

This specification defines a widely used numbering scheme for aircraft parts and the appearance of printed aircraft maintenance information. The Federal Aviation Administration's JASC (Joint Aircraft System/Component) code table provides a modified version of ATA Spec 100.

ATA Spec 100 contains format and content guidelines for technical manuals written by aviation manufacturers and suppliers, and is used by airlines and other segments of the industry in the maintenance of their respective products. This document provides the industrywide standard for aircraft systems numbering, often referred to as the ATA system or ATA chapter numbers. The format and content guidelines define the data prepared as conventional printed documentation. In 2000 ATA Spec 100 and ATA Spec 2100 were incorporated into ATA iSpec 2200: Information Standards for Aviation Maintenance. ATA Spec 100 and Spec 2100 will not be updated beyond the 1999 revision level.

ATA Spec 300: Specification for Packaging of Airline Supplies
ATA Spec 300 establishes regulations that ensure effective packaging for supplies and equipment shipped by airlines. It stipulates, for example, that a shipping case be able to withstand a minimum of 100 shipments, have durable recessed handles, be coated with non-corrosive products, and have rounded well constructed edges. There has been an increased use of personal luggage that meets the ATA 300 required standards.  The ATA Spec 300 was first published on August 1, 1960.

Membership

ATA Airline Members
Alaska Airlines, Inc. (AS)
American Airlines, Inc. (AA)
Atlas Air, Inc. (5Y)
Delta Air Lines, Inc. (DL)
Federal Express Corporation (FX)
Hawaiian Airlines (HA)
JetBlue Airways Corp. (B6)
Southwest Airlines Co. (WN)
United Airlines, Inc. (UA)
UPS Airlines (5X)

On October 27, 2015, Delta Air Lines, Inc. (DL) elected to leave A4A at the end of April 2016, following various disagreements with other members. However, on October 29, 2015, A4A voted to remove Delta Air Lines effective immediately so the Members would speak with one voice. On December 18, 2019, Delta Air Lines, Inc. (DL) and A4A jointly announced that Delta Air Lines would rejoin in 2020.

Associate Airline Members
Air Canada (AC)

See also

 Regional Airline Association
 Major airlines of the United States

References

External links
 
JASC Code

 
Airline trade associations
Trade associations based in the United States
Organizations based in Washington, D.C.
Organizations established in 1936
1936 establishments in Washington, D.C.
Transportation associations in the United States